Physique 57 is a global fitness and media company headquartered in New York City offering a fitness experience in boutique studios and through proprietary and third party digital platforms. It has corporate-owned and franchised studios in the US, the United Arab Emirates, India and Thailand.

Founded by Jennifer Vaughan Maanavi and Tanya Becker in 2006, the company, was named No. 377 in Inc. Magazine's list of the 500 fastest growing companies in America in 2010. In 2021, Physique 57 was named a top 20 fitness app by Good Housekeeping.

Celebrity clients

Celebrity clients include Kelly Ripa, Sarah Jessica Parker,  Alessandra Ambrosio, Erin Andrews, Emmy Rossum, Demi Moore, Chrissy Teigen, Parker Posey, Norma Kamali and Mary Louise Parker among many others.

History

Physique 57 is a fitness brand, franchisor, barre content developer and distributor. Its co-founder Jennifer Vaughan Maanavi is a dance enthusiast, Columbia MBA and former Wall Street professional. In 2005, Maanavi partnered with Tanya Becker, one of the foremost instructors of the Lotte Berk Method (a fitness studio that offered the eponymous technique created in the 1950s by a former ballet dancer) to launch Physique 57. In 2021, the company launched an 80-hour virtual barre certification program.

Expansion

In February 2006, Physique 57 began at 24 W. 57th Street in New York City, United States. Its Bridgehampton outpost opened in Lotte Berk's former space at 264 Butter Lane Barn. In the fall of 2007, the Spring Street location opened in Soho's historic Butterick building.

In June 2010, Physique 57 Beverly Hills launched its studio just steps from Rodeo Drive and was honored as Best New Fitness Class by Los Angeles Magazine. In August 2011, it opened its third Manhattan studio on the Upper West Side, in the famous Ansonia. In November 2012, it raised the barre again by launching an online workout program, giving clients around the world the chance to benefit from their signature workouts – anywhere, anytime.

In the summer of 2013, Physique 57 opened its first international studio in Dubai. In 2014, it opened its second international studio in Bangkok and in 2015, opened another international studio in Dubai.

In January 2016, Physique 57 opened its fourth Manhattan studio in the Financial District. In 2017, Bangkok opened two more locations. In 2018, the Mumbai studio launched and in 2019, the company launched the US Franchise Program and Virtual Studio named Physique LIVE. In 2021, their first Midwest studio opened in Carmel, Indiana.

Partnerships

Physique 57 partnered with Biore Skincare in 2010 and with Fitbit in 2019. It has also partnered with One&Only Ocean Club and in 2021 with FlexIt.

It had also partnered with Plus One (2012), Canyon Ranch (2010), QVC (2012-2014), and Apptiv (2020).

Book

In January 2012, co-founders Tanya Becker and Jennifer Maanavi wrote their first book, The Physique 57 Solution: The Groundbreaking 2-Week Plan for a Lean, Beautiful Body. This combination of a workout with an effective meal plan, created a two-week program from which readers quickly dropped pounds and lost up to 10 inches.

Awards and recognition

 Best Prenatal Workout - New York Magazine 2007
 One of the best online workout classes - the Strategist 
 One of the best Barre classes 2021 - Byrdie 
 Ranked No. 377 in Inc. Magazine's list of the 500 fastest growing companies in America.
 Named among the top 20 fitness app by Good Housekeeping.

References

External links
 
 New York Times: The Time of the Tummy

Fitness apps
Physical exercise
Exercise organizations
Exercise-related trademarks